Along Airport  also  known as Aalo Airport is located at Along in the state of Arunachal Pradesh, India.

The Government of Arunachal Pradesh handed over the airstrip to the Ministry of Defence in June 2009. The government has proposed to operationalise a civil enclave at the airport.

The Airports Authority of India (AAI) had sent a report to the state government and the Indian Air Force in July 2011 for the removal of obstacles around the aerodrome for safe flight operations and cited a requirement of seven acres of land for the development of the civil enclave.

Incidents
On 7 April 1964, a Kalinga Airlines Dakota overshot the runway and caught fire. There were no casualties, though the aircraft was damaged beyond economic repair.

References

External links
 Along Airport

Airports in Arunachal Pradesh
West Siang district
Airports with year of establishment missing